Sven Eric Gamsky (born June 23, 1992), known professionally as Still Woozy, is an American singer and songwriter from Oakland, California. Gamsky grew up in Moraga, California, in the San Francisco Bay Area. He began recording his own music at the age of 13.

NME has described his style as "psychedelic bedroom-pop", while IQ sees it as "genre-bending".

Early life
Sven Gamsky was born on June 23, 1992, in Oakland, California, and grew up in Moraga, California. He is the youngest of three sons born to Dr. Tom and Berit (Fuglsang) Gamsky, and has two older brothers, Nate and Sam. Sven started playing the guitar when he was in middle school.

All of the Gamsky brothers became Eagle Scouts. Sven was a part of Moraga Boy Scout Troop 212, in which his service project toward becoming an Eagle Scout involved remodeling a garden area at Donald L. Rheem Elementary School in Moraga. The East Bay Times reported in 2010 upon his achievement of Eagle Scout that "Sven plans to travel and volunteer after high school, and eventually study psychology in college."

Sven Gamsky attended Campolindo High School in Moraga, California. He graduated in 2010. While in high school, he played guitar and bass in the band "Shoot for Roots". At the beginning of their senior year, "Shoot for Roots" won a Battle of the Bands competition hosted by the Lamorinda Teen Center. They had initially come to a tie with a band called IceBox Business from rival high school, Miramonte High School, but fans from Campolindo High broke the tie by cheering louder for Gamsky's band with a recording of 116 decibels.

After high school, Gamsky earned money by teaching guitar in the Oakland area and playing with the band Feed Me Jack at jazz clubs, festivals, and orchestra halls. He graduated from University of California, Santa Cruz in 2015, majoring in music with a classical guitar emphasis, and minoring in electronic music.

Career

2011–2016: Feed Me Jack 
From 2011 to 2016, Gamsky was in the alternative rock/math rock band called Feed Me Jack. Gamsky met the other band members his freshman year at University of California, Santa Cruz. The band released four albums. In 2016, the band separated, on good terms, in order for the members to individually pursue their careers in music.

2019–present: Still Woozy 
In 2017, Gamsky released his first single, "Vacation", under the stage name Still Woozy. 25 years old at the time, Gamsky stated that he chose the name because of his spaced-out nature. 

In 2019, Gamsky went on tour, which included sets in many U.S. states on the West Coast and throughout the midwestern states. He also played in some locations in Canada and The Netherlands.

Still Woozy's song, Cooks, was featured in 2018 Netflix movie, The After Party.

A 2020 tour, which would have had 31 performances starting in May and ending in September, was postponed due to the COVID-19 pandemic.

In 2020, Gamsky's single, Window, was featured in FIFA 21.

On August 13, 2021, he released his debut album If This Isn't Nice, I Don't Know What Is. It serves as Still Woozy's first studio album, including the singles 'Window', 'Rocky', 'That's Life', and 'Get Down', which had been released prior to the album.

In June 2021, Still Woozy announced his If This Isn't Nice, I Don't Know What Is tour. This tour is set to have 54 performances spanning across the United States, the United Kingdom and Australia. This tour's set list included the majority of songs from his 2021 debut album of the same name, along with some of his most popular hits. The tour featured two alternating openers or "special guests", Loveleo and Wallice.

In 2022, on April 15 & 22, Still Woozy performed at the festival Coachella at the Empire Polo Club in Indio, California. Later in the year he helped produce the song "Too Late" on SZA's album SOS.

As of 2022, Still Woozy has released an album, an EP and several singles and four music videos, the first of which was released in 2017. Gamsky prefers to release music as soon as possible and will sometimes release a song on the same day he has finished making it.

Album information 
Still Woozy's 2021 debut album If This Isn't Nice, I Don't Know What Is contains 13 songs. As of 2022, this is his only album released. 

The title of this album is a Kurt Vonnegut quote. In a September 2021 interview with The Village Voice, Gamsky references Kurt Vonnegut and highlights the importance of recognizing the good moments in your life. In the same interview, Gamsky also continues that the cancelation of his 2020 tour due to Covid-19 was the best thing to happen to his debut album as it allowed him "to really double down on it and figure it out". 

This album also features Gamsky on the album cover instead of the past art that has been featured previous to this album release. In a 2022 interview, Gamsky stated that "wanted there to be some sort of delineation between the single art and the (album) cover art."

Gamsky self-produces his music content, but on If This Isn't Nice, I Don't Know What Is he enlisted his friend, Lars Stalfors, for help. Although this friend does not play any instruments, Gamsky stated that it was helpful to have a "sounding board."

Personal life 
Gamsky married long time girlfriend Amiya Kahn-Tietz the last weekend of July 2022. He has stated that she is his biggest inspiration. She is the artist behind Still Woozy's single covers.

Discography

With Feed Me Jack
 Chumpfrey (2012) 
 Anatolia (2013) 
 Covers (2015) 
 Ultra Ego (2016)

As Still Woozy

Studio albums

Extended plays

Singles

References

External links
 
 

Musicians from San Francisco
Interscope Records artists